Omar Fernando Tobio (born October 18, 1989) is an Argentine professional footballer currently playing for Huracan.

Club career

Tobio made his debut for Vélez Sársfield on March 1, 2008. In 2009, he was part of the squad that won the Clausura tournament, though he did not play any games. He did however play 8 games in Vélez' following league title, the 2011 Clausura, mainly as a backup for the starting centre backs Sebastián Domínguez and Fernando Ortiz. He also finished the tournament as a starter, replacing injured Fabián Cubero as a right full back; and played 5 games in the 2011 Copa Libertadores, scoring one goal in the semi-finals against Peñarol.

After Fernando Ortiz's departure from Vélez following the 2011–12 season, Tobio became a regular starter in Vélez's first team, playing alongside Sebastián Domínguez as centre backs, and helping the team obtain the 2012 Inicial league title.

International

In January 2009, Tobio was called for the Argentina under-20 squad that played the South American Youth Championship in Venezuela. He played all 9 games as the team finished 6th, failing to qualify for the U-20 World Cup.

In November 2010, Tobio was selected as part of an Argentine league squad to train twice weekly with the Argentina national team.

Honours
Vélez Sársfield
 Argentine Primera División: 2009 Clausura, 2011 Clausura, 2012 Inicial, 2012–13 Superfinal
 Supercopa Argentina: 2013

Boca Juniors
 Argentine Primera División: 2015, 2016–17
 Copa Argentina: 2015

References

External links
  
 
 Tobio es refuerzo de Huracán Olé, 17 January 2022 

1989 births
Living people
Sportspeople from Buenos Aires Province
Argentine footballers
Argentine expatriate footballers
Argentina under-20 international footballers
Association football defenders
Club Atlético Vélez Sarsfield footballers
Sociedade Esportiva Palmeiras players
Boca Juniors footballers
Rosario Central footballers
Deportivo Toluca F.C. players
Estudiantes de La Plata footballers
Club Atlético Huracán footballers
Argentine Primera División players
Campeonato Brasileiro Série A players
Liga MX players
Argentine expatriate sportspeople in Mexico
Argentine expatriate sportspeople in Brazil
Expatriate footballers in Mexico
Expatriate footballers in Brazil